The Polar Medal is a Canadian medal intended to honour explorers of Canada's polar regions and defenders of the country's sovereignty in the north. The medal was initially conceived by Governor General Adrienne Clarkson as the Governor General's Northern Medal and created on September 15, 2005, to award those who served with distinction in northern Canada. It was replaced by the Polar Medal on June 23, 2015.

History
Until 1967, Canadians were eligible for the United Kingdom's Polar Medal (known as the Arctic Medal until 1904), since Canada had not yet promulgated its own system of honours and employed that of the United Kingdom. On September 15, 2005, Governor General Adrienne Clarkson created the Governor General's Northern Medal. That medal was incorporated into and replaced by the new Canadian Polar Medal on June 23, 2015, the 145th anniversary of the transfer to Canada of Rupert's Land and the North-Western Territory (today the Northwest Territories). The first medals were presented at a ceremony in the Yukon Territory on July 8, 2015.

Design
The Governor General's Northern Medal was designed by Cathy Bursey-Sabourin. It was set in a crystal base and depicted on its obverse a snowy owl (guardian spirit), the aurora borealis (scope of the North), and a Canadian arctic diamond (the North Star). On the reverse are the words Governor General’s Northern Medal/ along with the recipient's name.

The Canadian Heraldic Authority designed the Polar Medal based on a concept by Major Carl Gauthier of the Directorate of Honours and Recognition section of the Department of National Defence. It is a silver, 36 mm diameter, octagonal disk that bears on its obverse an effigy of Canada's monarch, Queen Elizabeth II (symbolising the sovereign as fount of honour), wearing a diadem with maple leaves and snowflakes and surrounded by the words ELIZABETH II DEI GRATIA REGINA, separated by two maple leaves from the word CANADA at the bottom. The edge of the obverse is decorated with small denticles. On the reverse is an image of the Royal Canadian Mounted Police schooner St. Roch (which patrolled the Arctic in the early to mid-20th century) adjacent to a tall iceberg, two crew standing on the ice. (Crew members of the St.Roch received the British Polar Medal.)

The medal is worn on the left chest suspended from a 32 mm wide white ribbon, which is affixed to a suspension bar showing a representation of the North Star with curved limbs on each side, intended to evoke the aurora borealis, winds, and water currents; should an individual already possessing the Polar Medal be awarded the medal again, they are granted a silver medal bar with raised edges, bearing a maple leaf at its centre, for wear on the ribbon from which the original medal is suspended. The medal will be cast by the Royal Canadian Mint.

Eligibility
The Governor General's Northern Medal was awarded to "citizens whose actions and achievements contributed to the evolution and constant reaffirmation of the Canadian North as part of our national identity."

The Polar Medal was created with the approval of Queen Elizabeth II to "recognize those who have contributed to or endeavoured to promote a greater understanding of Canada’s Northern communities and its people", as well as "those individuals who have withstood the rigours of the polar climate to make significant contributions to polar exploration and knowledge, scientific research, and the securement of Canada's Northern sovereignty." Nominations may be made by any person or group at any time. A committee in the Chancellery of Honours at Rideau Hall reviews the nominations and makes recommendations to the governor general. Unlike the Governor General's Northern Medal, the Polar Medal is a part of the Canadian honours system.

Recipients
Governor General's Northern Medal

 Bertha Allen
 Nellie Cournoyea
 Tagak Curley
 Georges Erasmus
 Louis Fortier
 Jill Heinerth
 Stephen Kakfwi
 Zacharias Kunuk
 Mary Simon
 Sheila Watt-Cloutier

See also
 Governor General's Awards
 Arctic Inspiration Prize

References

External links

 Inuit activist wins Northern Medal

Civil awards and decorations of Canada
Northern Canada